Jailletville is a community in Weldford located 5.33 km SE of Beersville.

History

Beersville was first called Girvan Settlement for Albert Girvan, Russel Girvan and Samuel Girvan, who were early settlers here. It was renamed Jailletville with the creation of the post office 1906-1958 with Charles F. Jaillet as first postmaster. The community of Ford Bank located 2.25 km NW of Normandie, had a Post Office 1917-1960 but the area is now considered a part of Jailletville as is the area known as Pine Ridge which is located 3.83 km E of Fords Mill, on the road to Ford Bank and it one time included the community of Girvan Settlement.  Jailletville is located on the Jailletville Road between Route 465 and Route 490

Girvan Settlement had a Post Office 1871-1874, Pine Ridge had a Post Office 1874-1959: and in 1898 Pine Ridge was a farming settlement with 1 post office and a population of 150. Today the old Girvan Farm is the home of The Green Festival, an annual celebration of family and green energy and a weekend music festival with camping.

In 2016, the Evolve Festival moved here from Antigonish, Nova Scotia.

Notable people

See also
List of communities in New Brunswick

References

Settlements in New Brunswick
Communities in Kent County, New Brunswick